Holy Family Catholic Schools (HFCS) is a Roman Catholic school system based in Dubuque, Iowa (USA). Holy Family, which operates schools in eastern Dubuque County, is a part of the Roman Catholic Archdiocese of Dubuque. As of the 2011–2012 school year, HFCS has 1,837 students enrolled in its schools (excluding preschools).

General information
HFCS currently operates:
 3 elementary schools
 1 middle school
 1 high school
 5 early childhood centers

Schools
Early Childhood Centers
 Holy Family Early Childhood

 Elementary Schools
 Resurrection Elementary School
 St. Anthony/Our Lady of Guadalupe Spanish Immersion Program 
 St. Columbkille Elementary School

Middle school
 Mazzuchelli Catholic Middle School

High school
 Wahlert Catholic High School

Former schools
 Former elementary schools
 Downtown Catholic School
 Holy Ghost School
 Sacred Heart-Holy Trinity School
 St. Anthony School
 St. Francis School

In 2019 the school system considered whether to close Holy Ghost School, which had 75 students, and/or St. Anthony School, which had 79 students. The decision was to close both effective 2020.

Downtown Catholic School (St. Mary-St. Patrick Consolidation) and Sacred Heart – Holy Trinity School became St. Francis School in 2002, and St. Francis closed in 2004. Four Oaks Family and Children Services bought the school building in 2006.

Enrollment
In the 2009-2010 school year, there were 2,113 students attending Holy Family Catholic Schools (including pre-K). Of those, 1,945 (92%) were white, 21 (1%) were black, 26 (1.2%) were Asian, 57 (2.7%) students were Hispanic, and 1 was American Indian. Additionally, 1,058 (50%) were male, and 1,055 (50%) were female.

History
In July 2001, Wahlert High School and all Dubuque Catholic elementary schools and Catholic early childhood centers joined to become one system under the name Holy Family Catholic Schools. This step was taken in an effort to continue making Catholic elementary and secondary schools in Dubuque available and accessible to all those who choose Catholic education.

See also
 Dubuque, Iowa
 List of school districts in Iowa

References

External links
 Holy Family Catholic Schools Website

Education in Dubuque, Iowa
Education in Dubuque County, Iowa
Private schools in Iowa
Roman Catholic Archdiocese of Dubuque
2011 establishments in Iowa
Educational institutions established in 2011